In mountaineering and hiking, the rest step is a human walking gait used in ascending steep slopes. Its essential characteristic is a pause of motion with the rear leg vertical and fully extended, while the front leg is relaxed except as needed to adjust the balancing of the climber's body and burden on the rear leg.

The goal includes "locking" the knee, in order to rest the weight on the skeleton (and relieve the leg muscles of exertion as much as possible).

Climbers may often execute the rest step spontaneously, if waiting either for the next step of a climber who is a step or two ahead, or for the energy to continue. Nevertheless, conscious practice at delaying the next step (requiring inhibition of a walking reflex) is widely deemed worthwhile. That skill enables ascent at the maximum steady pace, on slopes where quadriceps endurance, or the rate of consumption of either energy or oxygen is the factor limiting the rate of advance, whether some climbers or all in the party are operating at that limit.

The rest step is especially emphasized in steep ascents on firm snow, often including the additional feature of keeping the moving foot close to the snow surface and scraping it against the snow as it comes to rest, especially to preserve and reinforce the improved footing available in the footprint left by the immediately previous climber.

References

 

Mountaineering techniques
Hiking